Cantuzumab mertansine (SB-408075; huC242-DM1) is an antibody-drug conjugate investigated to treat colorectal cancer and other types of cancer. It is a humanized monoclonal antibody, cantuzumab (huC242) linked to a cytotoxic agent, mertansine (DM1). It was developed by ImmunoGen.

Mechanism
After the huC242 mab binds to the external domain of CanAg, the cantuzumab mertansine-CanAg complex is internalized, and the DM1 molecules are released intracellularly by cleavage of the DM1-huC242 disulfide bonds.

Clinical trials
Three phase I clinical studies had reported results by 2003. By 2005, clinical development had been suspended.

See also 
 Cantuzumab ravtansine

References 

Antibody-drug conjugates
Monoclonal antibodies for tumors
Experimental cancer drugs